DEAD-box helicase 53 is a protein that in humans is encoded by the DDX53 gene.

Function

This intronless gene encodes a protein which contains several domains found in members of the DEAD-box helicase protein family. Other members of this protein family participate in ATP-dependent RNA unwinding.

References

Further reading